Idalus perlineosa is a moth of the family Erebidae. It was described by Walter Rothschild in 1917. It is found in Costa Rica.

References

perlineosa
Moths described in 1917